Hasin-e Bozorg (also Romanized as Hāsīn-e Bozorg; also known as Hāsan, Ḩāsān Bozorg, Hasoon Bozorg, Hāsūn, Hāsūn-e Bozorg, and Hussain) is a village in Chaybasar-e Jonubi Rural District, in the Central District of Maku County, West Azerbaijan Province, Iran. At the 2006 census, its population was 219, in 49 families.

References 

Populated places in Maku County